George Mead Robbins (12 September 1903 – 5 October 1998) was an Australian rules footballer who played with St Kilda, Carlton and Footscray in the Victorian Football League (VFL).

Notes

External links 

George Robbins's profile at Blueseum

1903 births
1998 deaths
Carlton Football Club players
St Kilda Football Club players
Western Bulldogs players
Australian rules footballers from Victoria (Australia)